Davies station is an elevated light rail transit station under construction in Edmonton, Alberta, as part of its Valley Line extension. It is located south-west of the intersection of 75 Street and Wagner Road, in Davies Industrial. The station will be the first elevated rail station utilized by the Edmonton Transit Service, and will include a 1,300 stall park and ride and a new transit centre. The station was scheduled to open in 2020; however, as of February 2023 the  Valley Line had not opened and no definite opening date had been announced. 

On January 22, 2018, the Edmonton Arts Council announced a large-scale public art installation, by world-renowned artist Shan Shan Sheng, would become part of Davies station. The station's wood roof consists of 15,498 individual pieces of timber which were prepared and treated in Edmonton by local businesses.

Around the station
Davies Industrial
Coronet Industrial
McIntyre Industrial
Roper Industrial
W.P. Wagner High School

Davies Transit Centre

The Davies Transit Centre is located on the west side of 75 Street. It has several amenities including bike racks, drop off area, public washrooms, a large shelter and an emergency phone.

The transit centre opened on September 4, 2022 and replaced the Millgate Transit Centre on 86 Street.

The following bus routes serve the transit centre:

	

The above list does not include LRT services from the adjacent LRT station.

References

External links
TransEd Valley Line LRT

Edmonton Light Rail Transit stations
Edmonton Transit Service transit centres
Railway stations under construction in Canada
Valley Line (Edmonton)